Cry No More may refer to:

Cry No More, band of Chas Cronk
Cry No More, album by Cry No More (1987)
Cry No More, album by Danielle Nicole, 2018
 "Cry No More" (Shareefa song), 2006
 "Cry No More" (Mika Nakashima song), 2006
 "Cry No More" (Yaakov Shwekey song)
 "Cry No More", song by The Outlaws from self-titled LP
 "Cry No More", song by G Herbo from the album, 25